ʮ	(turned h with fishhook) is a symbol from extensions to IPA for apical dental rounded syllabic alveolar fricative. That is, it is the "z" sound in English pronounced with rounded lips, and treated as a vowel in a syllable. It is used by Sinologists when transcribing words from various languages. The standard IPA notation would be . See Obsolete and nonstandard symbols in the International Phonetic Alphabet for more information.

Unicode

Latin letters with diacritics
H with fishhook
H with fishhook